Sukumar Sengupta Mahavidyalaya, also known as Keshpur College, established in 2004, is a college in Keshpur in the Paschim Medinipur district. It offers undergraduate courses in arts and sciences. It is affiliated to Vidyasagar University.

Departments

Science

Chemistry
Physics
Mathematics
Botany
Zoology
Physiology
Nutrition

Arts

Bengali
English
Sanskrit
History
Geography
Political Science
Physical Education
Education
philosophy
Computer application

See also

References

External links
 Sukumar Sengupta Mahavidyalaya

Universities and colleges in Paschim Medinipur district
Colleges affiliated to Vidyasagar University
Educational institutions established in 2004
2004 establishments in West Bengal